Perboewatan (also spelled Perbuatan or Perbuwatan; apparently a Malay word of uncertain derivation) was one of the three main volcanic cones (the others being Danan and Rakata) on the island of Krakatoa (or Krakatau), in the Sunda Strait, in Indonesia. It was the lowest (400 ft) and northernmost of the cones.

Form
Photographed on May 27, 1883 by visitors to the island, Perboewatan is the only cone on Krakatoa of which quality pre-1883 photographs exist. In the photos, it appears to be a low hill with a flat top. Samples were collected, revealing upon analysis a silica (SiO2) content of 65%.

Eruptions

1680–81
In February 1681, two individuals traveling through the Straits witnessed the eruption of Krakatoa. Johann Wilhelm Vogel, a mining assayer, was told that the eruption began in May 1680. Since they were passing to the north of the island, it was apparent that the cone they witnessed was Perboewatan. This is backed up by Verbeek's visit in 1880, during which he took samples from a "fresh-looking" lava flow on the northern coast. The flow was unweathered, with little vegetation, indicating recent origin.

1883

Perboewatan began erupting on 20 May 1883,  On 27 May 1883, the General Governor Loudon took a sight-seeing group of about 90 to Krakatoa, landing on the northern end of the island, just below Perboewatan. Several in the party climbed up to the crater, which was still erupting. As the ship was leaving, a photographer took several photos of the erupting volcano.

In Rogier Verbeek's reconstruction of the eruption, Perboewatan is thought to have been the first cone destroyed, at about 4:40 am on 27 August.

References

Volcanic cones
Sunda Strait
Krakatoa